Mewar University India is a university in Chittorgarh, Rajasthan, India.

Overview
Mewar University is promoted by the Mewar Education Society (MES). It is controlled by a Board of Management, constituted by the MES, which is headed by Chairperson Dr. Ashok Kumar Gadiya. It is an autonomous body set up by the Government of Rajasthan.

The campus is located 25 km away from the city of Chittorgarh, in the vicinity of the Aravali mountain range. It covers 30 acres. There is accommodation for around 3000 students, with sports facilities and a gymnasium.

Academic programmes
The university offers a range of undergraduate, postgraduate, diploma and doctoral programmes through the following faculties and schools:
 Agriculture & Veterinary Science
 Alternative Therapy
 Engineering & Technology
 Computer Science and System Studies
 Education & Psychology
 Fire Safety and Hazard Management
 Humanities, Social Science & Fine Arts
 Legal Studies
 Management and Commerce
 Mass and Media Communication
 Medical, Surgery and Paramedical
Mewar University Hospital
Nursing
Physical Education
Science & Technology
 Tourism and Hospitality Management
 Vocational Sciences, Skill Development & Entrepreneurship Studies
 Yoga and Naturopathy
The University promotes active collaboration with the government, trade and industry. Students are required to undertake industry oriented projects of their choice during their internship.

References 

Education in Chittorgarh district
Universities in Rajasthan